Nic Sampson is a New Zealand actor, comedian, and writer known for his roles as Chip Thorn, the Yellow Mystic Ranger on Power Rangers Mystic Force, Detective Constable Sam Breen on The Brokenwood Mysteries, and for the New Zealand sketch show Funny Girls.

Life and career 

Sampson portrayed Chip Thorn, the Yellow Mystic Ranger on Power Rangers Mystic Force which premiered in 2006. He was also the voice of the Sentinel Knight on Power Rangers Operation Overdrive, and various monsters in subsequent series.

Sampson portrays Detective Constable Sam Breen in The Brokenwood Mysteries, a New Zealand detective, drama television series that premiered on Prime in 2014.

In 2014, Sampson won Best Newcomer at the New Zealand International Comedy Festival. In 2015 he was nominated for the Billy T Award and in 2016 Sampson was nominated for the Fred Award for best New Zealand show.

Sampson was a writer and performer for NZ news satire show The Jono Project and Jono and Ben. Sampson was also a writer and performer for sketch comedy Funny Girls which ran for three seasons (2015–2018). He is one of the creators of NZ sitcom Golden Boy.

Sampson is a founding member of Auckland-based improvised comedy collective Snort.

In 2021, Sampson joined Rose Matafeo and Alice Snedden as co-writer for the second series of BBC Three and HBO Max's Starstruck.

Filmography

Television

Film

References

Living people
21st-century New Zealand male actors
Male actors from Wellington City
New Zealand male comedians
New Zealand male film actors
New Zealand male television actors
Year of birth missing (living people)